Botten Soot (born Ingeborg Bergit Soot; 22 March 1895 – 21 May 1958) was a Norwegian actress, singer, and dancer.

Personal life
Born in Bergen, she was the daughter of painter Eyolf Soot  (1859–1928) and children's theatre pioneer Inga Bjørnson, and was half-sister of actress Guri Stormoen (1871–1952). She also gave birth to a child, Svend von Düring. She learned ballet as a child and was a student at Thora Hals Olsen ballet school; later she studied singing with Bergljot Ibsen, Wilhelm Cappelen Kloed and Raimund von zur-Mühlen, and harmony with Carsten Carlsen.

Career
Soot made her stage debut as dancer in 1911, as revue artist at Chat Noir in 1913, and as a singer at Nationaltheatret in 1914. She spent most of her career entertaining at the revue stage Chat Noir where she performed together with Einar Rose, artistic director at Chat Noir and at the Mayol-teatret   opposite theater and film actor Harald Heide Steen. Botten also performed together with  theatre actress and singer Tutta Rolf  and her husband  Ernst Rolf. Among her best known texts were Vårvise and De gammeldagse Piger. Her book Mamma i fint selskap og andre historier was published in 1946.

Filmography
 Under forvandlingens lov (1911)
 En vinternat (1917)
 De forældreløse (1917)
 Jomfru Trofast (1921)

References

1895 births
1958 deaths
Actors from Bergen
Norwegian stage actresses
Norwegian film actresses
Norwegian silent film actresses
20th-century Norwegian actresses